River Valley High School is the high school for the River Valley School District located in Three Oaks, Michigan, United States.  River Valley High School houses grades 6-12.

Demographics
The demographic breakdown of the 315 students enrolled for 2017-18 was:
Male - 54.9%
Female - 45.1%
Native American/Alaskan - 1.3%
Asian - 0.3%
Black - 1.0%
Hispanic - 4.1%
White - 89.5%
Multiracial - 3.8%

49.2% of these students were eligible for free or reduced-cost lunch. For 2017–18, River Valley was a Title I school.

Athletics
The River Valley Mustangs compete in the BCS League. Navy blue and white are the school colors. The following Michigan High School Athletic Association (MHSAA) sanctioned sports are offered:

Baseball (boys) 
State champion - 1995, 1997
Basketball (girls and boys) 
Boys state champion - 1979
Cross country (girls and boys) 
Football (boys)
Golf (boys)
Soccer (girls) 
Softball (girls)
Track and field (girls and boys) 
Volleyball (girls) 
Wrestling (boys)

References

External links

Public high schools in Michigan
Schools in Berrien County, Michigan
Public middle schools in Michigan